Ève is a French given name, the counterpart to the English name Eve and the Latinate Eva. Notable people with this name include:

People
 Ève Angeli, French musician
 Ève Bazaiba, a member of the Movement of the Liberation of the Congo
 Ève Bélisle, a curler
 Ève de Castro, winner of the Prix des Libraires in 1962
 Ève Curie, a French author
 Ève Demaillot, an 18th century revolutionary
 Ève Francis, assistant to Paul Claudel
 Ève Lavallière, member of the Secular Franciscan Order
 Ève Périsset, a footballer playing for Girondins de Bourdeaux
 Ève Salvail (born 1971), Canadian model

Music
 Ève (Massenet), an oratorio by Jules Massenet

Feminine given names
Given names
French feminine given names